Leo Ahonen (born 6 February 1944) is a Finnish rower. He competed at the 1972 Summer Olympics and the 1976 Summer Olympics.

References

External links
 

1944 births
Living people
Finnish male rowers
Olympic rowers of Finland
Rowers at the 1972 Summer Olympics
Rowers at the 1976 Summer Olympics
People from Kouvola
Sportspeople from Kymenlaakso